The initials NACP can stand for:

 National AIDS Control Programme, a government health organization in Tanzania
 Sodium cyclopentadienide (NaCp), a chemical compound